Dame Flora Jane Duffy  (born 30 September 1987) is a Bermudian triathlete. She won a gold medal at the 2020 Summer Olympics in Tokyo, Bermuda's first gold medal. She also competed in Beijing, London, and Rio de Janeiro Olympics. In 2018, she won gold in the women's triathlon at the XXI Commonwealth Games in Australia. She also won gold in the same event at the XXII Commonwealth Games in Birmingham in 2022.

Athletic career 
Duffy is the 2016 and 2017 ITU World Triathlon Series World Champion, the 2015 and 2016 ITU Cross Triathlon World Champion, and a six-time winner (2014-2017, 2019, 2021) of the XTERRA World Championships.

She competed for Bermuda at the 2008 Summer Olympics in Beijing, the 2012 Summer Olympics in London, the 2016 Summer Olympics in Rio de Janeiro, and the 2020 Summer Olympics in Tokyo, where she won gold. It was Duffy's first Olympic medal and Bermuda's first gold medal. Duffy's medal also made Bermuda the smallest country in the world to have won a gold medal at the Summer Olympics.

In April 2018, Duffy won the first gold medal of the XXI Commonwealth Games in Gold Coast, Australia. Duffy won the women's sprint triathlon by a 43-second lead, becoming Bermuda's first female Commonwealth gold medalist. She was also scheduled to compete in the women's cross-country mountain bike at the Commonwealth Games, but did not start the event.

Duffy is the only person to win three triathlon world titles in the same year in 2016, claiming the WTS, ITU Cross Triathlon, and Xterra titles in close succession. Duffy is the only triathlete in WTS history to post the fastest swim, bike, and run portions in the same race. Duffy holds the record for the largest winning margin in both Olympic and Sprint distance races in a WTS event.

Duffy was appointed Officer of the Order of the British Empire (OBE) in the 2018 Birthday Honours and Dame Commander of the Order of the British Empire (DBE) in the 2022 New Year Honours, both for services to sport in Bermuda. After beating Georgia Taylor-Brown, she was crowned as the ITU Triathlon World Champion on the 25 of November, 2022. In Abu Dhabi.

Personal life
Duffy is of English parentage: her father is from Barrow-in-Furness, and her mother is from Burnley; therefore, she was eligible to represent Great Britain but opted to represent Bermuda, where she grew up. Duffy was privately educated at the independent Warwick Academy, then abroad at the independent Kelly College in England and the University of Colorado Boulder, where she graduated with a BA degree in Sociology.

Duffy launched The Flora Fund days after winning the inaugural WTS Bermuda in April 2018. Through the fund, Duffy hopes to enable youth in Bermuda to pursue their potential, ultimately contributing to a healthier, more ambitious community.

In December 2017, Duffy married South African triathlete Dan Hugo in Stellenbosch, Hugo's native town, where the couple reside when not training in Boulder.

References

External links
 
 
The Flora Fund - Duffy's foundation

Living people
Bermudian female triathletes
Triathletes at the 2008 Summer Olympics
Triathletes at the 2012 Summer Olympics
Triathletes at the 2016 Summer Olympics
Olympic triathletes of Bermuda
1987 births
People from Paget Parish
British female triathletes
University of Colorado Boulder alumni
Triathletes at the 2014 Commonwealth Games
Triathletes at the 2015 Pan American Games
Triathletes at the 2020 Summer Olympics
Pan American Games bronze medalists for Bermuda
Pan American Games medalists in triathlon
Central American and Caribbean Games silver medalists for Bermuda
Triathletes at the 2018 Commonwealth Games
Triathletes at the 2022 Commonwealth Games
Commonwealth Games medallists in triathlon
Commonwealth Games gold medallists for Bermuda
Competitors at the 2010 Central American and Caribbean Games
Central American and Caribbean Games medalists in triathlon
Medalists at the 2015 Pan American Games
Medalists at the 2020 Summer Olympics
Olympic gold medalists for Bermuda
Olympic medalists in triathlon
Bermudian people of English descent
Dames Commander of the Order of the British Empire
Sporting dames
Medallists at the 2018 Commonwealth Games
Medallists at the 2022 Commonwealth Games